Elena Tomilova  (born ) is a retired Russian female volleyball player. She was part of the Russia women's national volleyball team.

She participated in the 1994 FIVB Volleyball Women's World Championship. On club level she played with Uralochka Ekaterinburg.

Clubs
 Uralochka Ekaterinburg (1994)

References

1967 births
Living people
Russian women's volleyball players
Place of birth missing (living people)
20th-century Russian women
21st-century Russian women